Makoto Iwasaki (born January 15, 1964) from the Nagoya Institute of Technology, Nagoya, Japan was named Fellow of the Institute of Electrical and Electronics Engineers (IEEE) in 2015 for contributions to fast and precise positioning in motion controller design.

References

Fellow Members of the IEEE
Living people
1964 births
Place of birth missing (living people)